Sarobarpur is a village in the district of Cuttack in Odisha, India. It is on the bank of the river Chitrotpala.

References

External links

Villages in Cuttack district